Giovanni Battista Costanzo (died 1617) was a Roman Catholic prelate who served as Archbishop of Cosenza (1591–1617).

Biography
On 5 April 1591, Giovanni Battista Costanzo was appointed during the papacy of Pope Gregory XIV as Archbishop of Cosenza. On 21 April 1591, he was consecrated bishop by Giulio Antonio Santorio, Cardinal-Priest of San Bartolomeo all'Isola, with Leonard Abel, Titular Bishop of Sidon and Giovanni Battista Santorio, Bishop of Tricarico serving as co-consecrators. He served as Archbishop of Cosenza until his death in 1617. While bishop, he was the principal consecrator of Francesco Monaco, Bishop of Martirano (1592); and Decio Caracciolo Rosso, Archbishop of Bari (1606).

References 

16th-century Italian Roman Catholic archbishops
17th-century Italian Roman Catholic archbishops
Bishops appointed by Pope Gregory XIV
1617 deaths